"Pop Out" is a song by American rapper Polo G featuring fellow American rapper Lil Tjay. The single was released on February 1, 2019 by Columbia Records as the third single the former's debut album, Die a Legend (2019). The music video for the song was released prior on January 13. The song reached number 11 on the US Billboard Hot 100.

Critical reception
Billboard magazine called the song a "hard-nosed anthem". The magazine also ranked it 45th on their 100 Best Songs of 2019 list.

Commercial performance
"Pop Out" debuted at number 95 on the US Billboard Hot 100, becoming both Polo G and Lil Tjay's first chart entry. It peaked at number 11 on the chart. On March 23, 2020, the single was certified quadruple platinum by the Recording Industry Association of America (RIAA) for combined sales and streaming data of over four million copies in the United States.

Remix

The official sequel of the song, titled "Pop Out Again", was released on June 7, 2019, when Polo G's album released. Lil Tjay's verse is replaced with verses by American rappers and frequent collaborators Lil Baby and Gunna.

On July 7, 2019, Canadian rapper Tory Lanez released an unofficial remix through his YouTube channel.

Charts

Weekly charts

Year-end charts

Certifications

Release history

References

2019 songs
2019 singles
Columbia Records singles
Polo G songs
Lil Tjay songs
Songs written by Polo G
Songs written by Lil Tjay